Ahn, also romanized An, is a Korean family name. 109 Korean clans are named 'Ahn', but with different origins. In 2000, there were 637,786 people bearing this surname in South Korea, making it the 20th most common family name in the country, with roughly 2% of the country's population.  North Korea does not release figures for surnames, but the percentage is expected to be more than in South Korea.

Clan
In the traditional Korean clan system, which is still the basis of family registry in South Korea, each clan is distinguished by its bon-gwan, the notional ancestral seat of the clan. Typically each clan claims a different person as its founder, although there are exceptions. 109 Ahn clans are extant today. However, most of these are very small. The majority of Ahns claim membership in the Sunheung Ahn clan (the highest and most noble clan of Ahns with the most well-known "blue-blood" status), also called An clan of Sunheung. The Kwangju and Juksan clans are also quite large and are associated with "blue-blood" status; in addition to these, the Tamjin, Gongsan, Chungju, Dongju, Jeuongwon, Ansan, Jecheon, Angang, and Jucheon clans are significant.

Sunheung Clan
73.5% of Korean surname 'Ahn' belongs to the Sunheung clan. The 2000 South Korean census counted 468,827 members of the "Sunheung" Ahn clan. It is a native clan connected with the town of Sunheung, Korea. The Sunheung Clan was the most noble and powerful clan among clans with surname Ahn, and was one of the Six Greatest Clans of all Korean clans during the Goryeo Dynasty and early Joseon Dynasty.

Sunheung Clan in Goryeo Dynasty

They have enjoyed "blue-blood" status as nobility since their earliest history in the Goryeo dynasty and throughout the Joseon dynasty (July 1392 - August 1910). The founder of the Sunheung-Ahn Clan was a famous military commander of Goryeo named Ahn Ja-mi. Ahn Ja-mi commanded Hongwiwi, the troop that escorted the Royal family, greeted foreign envoys, participated in national ceremonies, fought in wars, and guarded the frontier (border area) in Goryeo Dynasty. Ahn Jami was honoured the title of the supreme commander of Samhowi (one of 3 Central Command) by King Sinjong of Goryeo. Founder Ahn Jami had three sons, Ahn Yeong-yu, Ahn Yeong-rin, Ahn Yeong-hwa. The Sunheung-Ahn Clan is divided into 3 different branches based on which of the three sons they descend from. The First Branch descending from Ahn Yeong-yu is called Lord (Duke) Chumil Branch (1파 추밀공파(樞密公派)). The Second Branch descending from Ahn Yeong-rin is called Lord (Duke) ByeolJang Branch (2파 별장공파(別將公派)). The Third Branch descending from Ahn Yeong-hwa is called Lord (Duke) Kyoseo Branch (3파 교서공파(校書公派)). From these three branches, there are 14 more sub-branches from the First Branch, 4 more sub-branches from the Second Branch, and 4 more sub-branches from the Third Branch.

The Sunheung-Ahn Clan became one of the most powerful and famous noble clans after Ahn Hyang, who is the grandson of Ahn Yeong-yu (the founder of the Lord (Duke) Chumil Branch and the great-grandson of Ahn Jami, the founder of the Sunheung-Ahn Clan. An Hyang passed the Gwageo(State examination) in 1260(Wonjong 1). And he served as Docheomuijungchan(Vice-premier). An Hyang is considered the founder of Neo-Confucianism in Korea, introducing Song Confucianism to the Goryeo Kingdom. An Hyang is generally numbered among the clan's most illustrious members, and founded a branch of his own within the Sunheung-Ahn Clan, called Lord (Duke) Moonsun Sub-Branch (문성공파(文成公派)). Subsequent to An Hyang and for the rest of the Goryeo Dyasty, the Sunheung-Ahn Clan had members passing the Gwageo(State Examination) for 11 generations; 20 members of the Sunheung-Ahn Clan were made into Dukes or Grand Dukes (봉군(封君)), and produced 17 Daejehaks(대제학), which were then the highest office academics could reach in the Royal Court, equivalent to today's Ministers of Education.

Sunheung Clan in Joseon Dynasty

After the fall of the Goryeo Dynasty and the establishment of the Joseon Dynasty in 1392, the Sunheung-Ahn Clan still remained one of the most powerful and famous noble clans, and was known for being one of the Six Greatest Clans in the kingdom. During the Joseon Dynasty, 641 members of the Sunheung-Ahn Clan passed the Gwageo(State Examination).

However, the Sunheung-Ahn Clan lost its power in the mid 15th century due to its support of King Danjong, a young king who was overthrown and then later assassinated by his uncle in the midst of political turmoil. The Sunheung-Ahn Clan led the movement to restore King Danjong back to the throne, which is one of the most well-known tragedies in the history of the Joseon Dynasty. Once the movement failed, the Sunheung-Ahn clan lost its status as one of the most prestigious clans in the kingdom, and members of the clan left the ancestral home of Sunheung and scattered around the kingdom to run away from the oppression of the government. The famous PiKkeut Village (End of the Blood Village, 피끝마을) resulted from the failure of this movement. The village gained its name from a massacre committed by the Joseon Dynasty on the 700 inhabitants of Sunheung, the ancestral home of the Sunheung-Ahn Clan, after the failure of the movement. The blood of the massacred people flowed in the stream and ended in PiKkeut Village, and thus the village got its name. The tragedy of Sunheung and PiKkeut Village was romanticised as the tragic fate of the Sunheung-Ahn Clan that stayed loyal to the young king, such as in DanJongEhSa (단종애사, 端宗哀史), a popular early 20th century Korean novel that described the life of King Danjong. Due to the Sunheung-Ahn clan's famous history of staying loyal to King Danjong, the surname Ahn became synonymous with being stubborn and loyal. There are three Korean surnames often associated with being stubborn - Ahn, Kang, and Choi - and among the three surnames, Ahn is the most famous due to this tragic history.

As the consequence of the failure of the Danjong Restoration Movement, the Sunheung-Ahn Clan was charged with treason. The ancestral home of Sunheung was called the Land of Treason, and the clan could not regain its former power and glory for the rest of the Joseon Dynasty. Due to this, the Sunheung-Ahn Clan did not produce many famous figures for the rest of the Joseon Dynasty. However, the Sunheung-Ahn Clan produced many well-known members after the fall of the Joseon Dynasty in late 19th century.

Relationship to the Royal Family
Note that most of the marriages below were during the early Joseon Dynasty, before the failure of the Restoration Movement of Danjong of Joseon.
Grand Princess Samhangukdaebuin of Sunheung Ahn Clan, married to Yi Bang-Seok, Grand Prince Uian, brother of Taejo of Joseon.
Princess Jeongkyeongbuin of Sunheung Ahn Clan, married to Yi Hwak, Prince Hareung, grand nephew of Taejo of Joseon.
Royal Noble Consort of Sunheung Ahn Clan, or Sunbin Ahn (善嬪 安氏), married to Taejong of Joseon.
Ahn Jong-ryeom, the son-in-law of Prince Jinan, eldest son of Taejong of Joseon.
Ahn Gwan, the son-in-law of Princess Sosuk, daughter of Taejong of Joseon.
Princess Sunheunggunbuin of Sunheung Ahn Clan, married to Yi Geo, Prince Yeongyang, son of Jungjong of Joseon.
Ahn Su-jeong, the son-in-law of Yi Jing, Prince Sungseon, son of Injo of Joseon.

Famous Members of Sunheung Clan

The most influential and respected members of the Sunheung Clan are An Hyang, who is considered the founder of Neo-Confucianism in Korea during Goryeo Empire, and An Chang Ho (Title: Dosan), a political leader during Colonial Japan and one of the founding members of the democratic government of Korea, whose life ended shortly after the arrest and release by the Colonial Japanese Government.

Before 26th Generation
An Hyang, an academic and official in the Royal Court in late Goryeo Dynasty. He introduced Neo-Confucianism to Korea. Also known as Lord(Duke) Moonsun, and founded the Moonsun branch within the First Branch of Sunheung-Ahn Clan.
An Yui, a military officer in mid-Joseon Dynasty. He is well known for winning against the Japanese in multiple battles under the command of Yi Sun-sin, the most famous military commander in Joseon Dynasty.

26th Generation
Ahn Cheol-soo, a South Korean politician, physician, and software entrepreneur. A two-time former presidential election candidate in 2012 and 2017. 26th generation of Lord(Duke) GamChal Sub-Branch of the First Branch of Sunheung-Ahn Clan.
Ahn Changho, a political leader during Colonial Japan, one of the founding members of the democratic government of Korea, and a leader in the Korean Independence Movement under the Japanese Occupation. Also one of the leaders of the Korean-American immigrant community in the United States.

28th Generation
An Jae-hong, a Korean independence activist, politician and journalist.

29th Generation
Ahn Hee-jung, a South Korean politician. He served as the 36th and 37th Governor of South Chungcheong Province.
Ahn Tae-hoon, the father of famous Korean independence activist An Jung-geun. He is well known for helping Kim Koo, one of the leading figures of the Korean Independence Movement.

30th Generation
An Jung-geun, a Korean-independence activist and receiver of the Order of Merit medal for National Foundation in 1962 by the South Korean government, the most prestigious civil decoration in the Republic of Korea, for his efforts for Korean independence.
An Gong-gun, younger brother of An Jung-geun, a Korean-independence activist who worked along with Kim Koo.
An Myeong-gun, cousin of An Jung-geun, a Korean-independence activist who was imprisoned with Kim Koo by the Japanese Colonial government.

31st Generation
An Choon-seng, a Korean-independence activist, military commander, and South Korean politician. He later became the first Principal of Korean Military Academy. Nephew of An Jung-geun.

Generation Ambiguous
Ahn Eak-tai, a classical composer and conductor, famous for composing the national anthem of South Korea, but also criticized for composing for the Japanese Colonial Government.
Ahn Jae-wook, a South Korean singer and actor. 
Ahn Jaehyo, known as Jaehyo, a South Korean singer and member of boy band Block B.
Ahn Sung-ki, a South Korean actor.
Ahn Nae-sang, a South Korean actor.
Victor An, a South Korean-born short-track speed-skater later naturalised into Russian citizenship.
Ahn So-hee, better known by the mononym Sohee, a South Korean actress and singer, and a former member of girl group Wonder Girls.
Hwasa, Ahn Hye-jin, a South Korean singer and rapper, member of girl group Mamamoo.
Tony An, Ahn Seung-ho, a South Korean singer, a member of boy band H.O.T.

Villages of Sunheung Clan
 Songcheon-ri, Hwaseong-myeon, Yeonbaek County, Hwanghae Province, North Korea
 Around the Shinanju-Myeon, Anju, South Pyongan Province, North Korea
 Dongseong Village, Hajeong-ri, Baeksan-myeon, Gimje, North Jeolla Province, South Korea
 Chukdong Village, Jambyeong-ri, Geumga-myeon, Chungju, South Chungcheong Province, South Korea
 Nu-San Village, Nu-San2-ri, YangChun-myeon, Gimpogun, Gyeonggi-do Province, South Korea 
 and others

Juksan Clan
The Juksan Ahn clan came from Ahngukjishin which means "the general who made the country peaceful". Three brothers Lee Jichun Lee Yeopchun and Lee Hwachun achieved a great victory against Japan in the Silla period. Juksan is a town name in Anseong city. Lee Jichun changed his name to Ahn Bangjun, and is the founder of the Juksan clan.

Relationship to the Royal Family

Goryo Dynasty
 Jeongbi-Ahnssi (4th wife of Gongmin of Goryeo)
 Hyeonbi-Ahnssi (wife of U of Goryeo)

Joseon Dynasty
 Wife of Hoesan-gun (son of a concubine of Seongjong of Joseon)
 Ahn Maeng-dam (husband of princess Jeongui, second daughter of Sejong the Great)
 Ahn Hong-ryang (daughter of Shinseong-gun, fourth son of Seonjo of Joseon)

Controversy
There's no place named Juksan in 9C.

Gwangju Clan
Ahn Banggeol is the founder of the Gwangju clan. The clan had 43,609 members in 2000 in South Korea, and 48,033 members in 2015 in South Korea. The population in North Korea is unknown.

Gimpo Clan

Tamjin Clan
The 2015 South Korean census counted 26,098 people of the "Tamjin" Ahn clan. It is a native clan connected with the Gangjin. Tamjin is an old name (before 14C) of Gangjin.
Ahn Woo is the founder of Tamjin clan. Ahn Woo put down the rebellion of Cho Il-shin as a Gunbupanseo (kind of military officer) in 1362.
Gi Cheol, who was the brother of Empress Gi, exerted his authority in Korea, and he had the Mongol Empire at his back. Ahn Woo put Gi Cheol to death. 
Ahn Woo put Red Turbans to rout who captured Uiju County and Chongju, as Northwest military commander.
Also, Ahn Ji, who was a renowned scholar, who was one of the writers of Yongbieocheonga is from the Tamjin clan.

List of persons with surname Ahn/An with unknown clan
 An Ba-ul (born 1994), South Korean sudoka and Olympic silver medalist
 An Chang-nam (1901–1930), first Korean aviator
 An Chang-rim (born 1994), South Korean judoka
 An Se-young (born 2002), South Korean badminton player
 Ahn Byong-man (born 1941), South Korean academic
 Ahn Chil-hyun (born 1979, stage name KangTa), South Korean singer-songwriter, member of boy band H.O.T.
 Ahn Daniel (born 1994, stage name Niel), South Korean singer and member of boy band Teen Top
 Ahn Eak-tae (1906–1965), Korean composer
 Ahn Eun-jin (born 1991), South Korean actress
 An Gyeong-ja (born 1950), South Korean volleyball player
 Ahn Hee-yeon (born 1992, stage name Hani), South Korean singer and member of girl group EXID
 Ahn Hye-jin (born 1995, stage name Hwasa), South Korean singer and member of girl group Mamamoo
 Ahn Hyo-jin (born 1991, stage name LE), South Korean singer and member of girl group EXID
 Ahn Hyo-seop, (born 1995), South Korean actor
 Ahn Jae-chang (born 1972), South Korean badminton player
 Ahn Jae-Hyun, (born 1987), South Korean model and actor
 Ahn Ji-hwan (born 1969), South Korean voice actor
 Ahn Ji-hye (born 1987), South Korean actress
 Joo Won Ahn (born 1993), South Korean ballet dancer
 Ahn Jung-hwan (born 1976), South Korean football player
 Ahn Jung-hyo (born 1941), South Korean novelist and translator
 Kyongwon Ahn (born 1937), South Korean taekwondo master, founder of the United Taekwondo Association in the United States
 Mikhail An (1952–1979), Soviet footballer
 Philip Ahn (1905–1978), Korean-American actor
 Priscilla Ahn (born 1984), Korean-American musician
 Ahn Sang-soo (born February 1946), South Korean politician, former chairperson of the Grand National Party
 Ahn Sang-soo (born May 1946), South Korean politician, former mayor of Incheon
 Ahn Shin-won (born 1978, stage name Danny Ahn), South Korean singer and member of boy band g.o.d
 An Sugil (1911–1977), Korean novelist
 Ahn Sung-Nam (born 1984), South Korean football player
 Ahn Tae-Eun (born 1985), South Korean football player
 An Ye-seul (born 1995), South Korean singer
 Ahn Yeon-seok (born 1984, stage name Yoo Yeon-seok), South Korean actor
 Ahn Sol-bin (born 1997), South Korean singer and member of girl group Laboum
 Ahn Young-mi (born 1983), South Korean comedian
 An Yu-jin (born 2003), South Korean singer and member of girl groups Iz*One and Ive
 An Byeong-hun (born 1991), South Korean professional golfer

See also
 The Ahn Trio, classical piano trio. 
List of Korean family names
Korean name
Korean culture

References

External links
 Sunheung Ahn Association

Korean-language surnames